Kazimierz Michał Władysław Wiktor Pułaski of the Ślepowron coat of arms (Casimir Pulaski ; March 4 or March 6, 1745  October 11, 1779) was a Polish nobleman, soldier, and military commander who has been called the "father of the American cavalry."

Born in Warsaw and following in his father's footsteps, he became interested in politics at an early age. He soon became involved in the military and in revolutionary affairs in the Polish–Lithuanian Commonwealth. Pulaski was one of the leading military commanders for the Bar Confederation and fought against the Commonwealth's foreign domination. When this uprising failed, he was driven into exile. Following a recommendation by Benjamin Franklin, Pulaski traveled to North America to help in the American Revolutionary War. He distinguished himself throughout the revolution, most notably when he saved the life of George Washington. Pulaski became a general in the Continental Army, and he and his friend, Michael Kovats, created the Pulaski Cavalry Legion and reformed the American cavalry as a whole. At the Battle of Savannah, while leading a cavalry charge against British forces, he was fatally wounded by grapeshot and died shortly after.

Pulaski is remembered as a hero who fought for independence and freedom in Poland and the United States. Numerous places and events are named in his honor, and he is commemorated by many works of art. Pulaski is one of only eight people to be awarded honorary United States citizenship. Analyses since the 1990s of Pulaski's presumed remains have raised the possibility that Pulaski was intersex.

Personal life 
Pulaski was born on March 6, 1745, in the manor house of the Pułaski family in Warsaw, Poland. Casimir was the second eldest son of Marianna Zielińska and Józef Pułaski, who was an advocatus at the Crown Tribunal, the Starost of Warka, and one of the town's most notable inhabitants. He was a brother of Franciszek Ksawery Pułaski and Antoni Pułaski. His family bore the Ślepowron coat of arms. The Pułaski family was Roman Catholic and early in his youth, Casimir Pulaski attended an elite college run by Theatines, a male religious order of the Catholic Church in Warsaw, but did not finish his education.

There is some circumstantial evidence that Pulaski was a Freemason. When Gilbert du Motier, Marquis de Lafayette laid the cornerstone of the monument erected in Pulaski's honour in Monterey Square in Savannah in 1824, a full Masonic ceremony took place with Richard T. Turner, High Priest of the Georgia chapter, conducting the service. Other sources claim Pulaski was a member of the Masonic Army Lodge in Maryland. A Masonic Lodge in Chicago is named Casimir Pulaski Lodge, No.1167, and a brochure issued by the lodge claims he obtained the degree of Master Mason on June 19, 1779, and was buried with full Masonic honours. To date, no surviving documents of Pulaski's actual membership have been found.

Military career 

In 1762, Pulaski started his military career as a page of Carl Christian Joseph of Saxony, Duke of Courland and the Polish king's vassal. He spent six months at the ducal court in Mitau, during which the court was interned in the palaces by the Russian forces occupying the area. He then returned to Warsaw, and his father gave him the village of Zezulińce in Podole; from that time, Pulaski used the title of Starost of Zezulińce.

Bar Confederation 

He took part in the 1764 election of the new Polish monarch, Stanisław II Augustus, with his family. In December 1767, Pulaski and his father became involved with the Bar Confederation, which saw King Stanisław as a Russian puppet and sought to curtail Russian hegemony over the Commonwealth. The confederation was actively opposed by the Russian forces stationed in Poland. Pulaski recruited a unit and, on February 29, 1768, signed the act of the confederation, thus declaring himself an official supporter of the movement. On March 6, he received a pułkownik (colonel) rank and commanded a chorągiew of cavalry. In March and April, Pulaski agitated among the Polish military, successfully convincing some forces to join the Confederates. He fought his first battle on April 20 near Pohorełe; it was a victory, as was another on April 23 near Starokostiantyniv. An engagement at Kaczanówka on April 28 resulted in a defeat. In early May, he garrisoned Chmielnik but was forced to retreat when allied reinforcements were defeated. He retreated to a monastery in Berdyczów, which he defended during a siege by royalist forces for over two weeks until June 16. Eventually, he was forced to surrender and was taken captive by the Russians. On June 28, he was released in exchange for a pledge that he would not again take up arms with the Confederates, and that he would lobby the Confederates to end hostilities. However, Pulaski considered the assurance to be non-binding and made a public declaration to that effect upon reaching a camp of the Confederates at the end of July. Agreeing to the pledge in the first place weakened his authority and popularity among the Confederates, and his own father considered whether or not he should be Court-martialed; some heated debates followed, and Pulaski was reinstated to active-duty only in early September.

In 1769, Pulaski's unit was again besieged by numerically superior forces, this time in the old fortress of Okopy Świętej Trójcy, which had served as his base of operations since December the previous year. However, after a staunch defence, he was able to break the Russian siege. On April 7, he was made the regimentarz of the Kraków Voivodeship. In May and June he operated near Przemyśl, but failed to take the town. Criticized by some of his fellow Confederates, Pulaski departed to Lithuania with his allies and a force of about 600 men on June 3. There, Pulaski attempted to incite a larger revolt against Russia; despite no decisive military successes, he was able to assemble a 4,000-strong army and deliver it back to a Confederate staging point. This excursion received international notice and gained him a reputation as the most effective military leader in the Bar Confederation. Next, he moved with his unit towards Zamość and — after nearly losing his life to the inferior forces of the future Generalissimo Alexander Suvorov in the disastrous Battle of Orekhowa — on the very next day, September 15, he was again defeated at the Battle of Włodawa with his forces almost completely dispelled. He spent the rest of the year rebuilding his unit in the region of Podkarpacie.

In February 1770, Pulaski moved near Nowy Targ, and in March, helped to subdue the mutiny of Józef Bierzyński. Based in Izby, he subsequently operated in southern Lesser Poland and on May 13 his force was defeated at the Battle of Dęborzyn. Around June 9–10 in Prešov, in a conference with other Confederate leaders, he met Joseph II, Holy Roman Emperor, who complimented Pulaski on his actions. On July 3–4, Pulaski's camp was captured by Johann von Drewitz, and he was forced to retreat into Austria. Early in August he met with the French emissary, Charles François Dumouriez. He disregarded an order to take Lanckorona and instead cooperated with Michał Walewski in a raid on Kraków on the night of August 31. He then departed for Częstochowa. On September 10, along with Walewski, he used subterfuge to take control of the Jasna Góra monastery. On September 18 he met Franciszka z Krasińskich, an aristocrat from the Krasiński family and the wife of Charles of Saxony, Duke of Courland; he impressed her and she would become one of his protectors. Around September 22–24 Walewski was made the commandant of Jasna Góra, which slighted Pulaski. Nonetheless he continued as the de facto commander of Confederate troops stationed in and around Jasna Góra. Between September 10, 1770, and January 14, 1771, Pulaski, Walewski and Józef Zaremba commanded the Polish forces during the siege of Jasna Góra monastery. They successfully defended against Drewitz in a series of engagements, the largest one on November 11, followed by a siege from December 31 to January 14. The defense of Jasna Góra further enhanced his reputation among the Confederates and abroad. A popular Confederate song taunting Drewitz included lyrics about Pulaski and Jasna Góra. Pulaski intended to pursue Drewitz, but a growing discord between him and Zaremba prevented this from becoming a real option.

In February 1771, Pulaski operated around Lublin; on February 25 he was victorious at Tarłów and on the night of February 28 and March 1, his forces besieged Kraśnik. In March that year he became one of the members of the Confederates' War Council. Dumouriez, who became a military adviser to the Confederates, at the time described him as "spontaneous, more proud than ambitious, friend of the prince of Courland, enemy of the Potocki family, brave and honest" as well as popular among other commanders. This was due to his refusal to follow orders and adhere to discipline. Jędrzej Kitowicz who met him as well around that time described him as short and thin, pacing and speaking quickly, and uninterested in women or drinking. Furthermore, he enjoyed fighting against the Russians above everything else, and was daring to the extent he forgot about his safety in battles, resulting in his many failures on the battlefield.

In May 1771, Pulaski advanced on Zamość, refusing to coordinate an operation with Dumouriez against Alexander Suvorov; without Pulaski's support, the Confederates were defeated at the Battle of Lanckorona. Pulaski's forces were victorious at the Battle of Majdany, and briefly besieged Zamość, but it was relieved by Suvorov. He retreated, suffering major losses, towards Częstochowa. On July 27, pressured by Franciszka z Krasińskich, he declared he would from then on strictly adhere to orders from the Confederacy that he had previously habitually disregarded. In October his responsibilities in the War Council were increased, and the same month he became involved with the plan to kidnap King Poniatowski. Pulaski was initially opposed to this plan but later supported it on the condition that the king would not be harmed. The attempt failed, weakening the international reputation of the Confederates, and when Pulaski's involvement with the attempted kidnapping became known, the Austrians expelled him from their territories. He spent the following winter and spring in Częstochowa, during which time several of his followers were defeated, captured or killed.

On May 31, 1772, Pulaski, increasingly distanced from other leaders of the Confederation, left the Jasna Góra monastery and went to Silesia in Prussia. In the meantime, the Bar Confederation was defeated, with most fighting ending around the summer. Overall, Pulaski was seen as one of the most famous and accomplished Confederate leaders. At the same time, he often acted independently, disobeying orders from Confederate command, and among his detractors (which included Dumouriez) had a reputation of a "loose cannon". The First Partition of Poland occurred in 1772.

Leaving Prussia, Pulaski sought refuge in France, where he unsuccessfully attempted to join the French Army. In 1773, his opponents in Poland accused him of attempted regicide, and proceedings began at the Sejm Court on June 7. The Partition Sejm had been convened by the victors to validate the First Partition.

Poniatowski himself warned Pulaski to stay away from Poland, or risk death. The court verdict, declared in absentia in July, stripped Pulaski of "all dignity and honors", demanded that his possessions be confiscated, and sentenced him to death. He attempted to recreate a Confederate force in the Ottoman Empire during the Russo-Turkish War, but before he could make any progress, the Turks were defeated, and he barely escaped by sea to Marseille, France. He found himself in debt and unable to find an army that would enlist him. He spent the year of 1775 in France, imprisoned at times for debts, until his allies gathered enough funds to arrange for his release. Around that time, due to the efforts of his friend Claude-Carloman de Rulhière, he was recruited by the Marquis de Lafayette and Benjamin Franklin (whom he met in spring 1777) for service in the American Revolutionary War.

In the United States

Northern front 
Franklin was impressed by Pulaski, and wrote of him: "Count Pulaski of Poland, an officer famous throughout Europe for his bravery and conduct in defence of the liberties of his country against the three great invading powers of Russia, Austria and Prussia ... may be highly useful to our service." He subsequently recommended that General George Washington accept Pulaski as a volunteer in the Continental Army cavalry and said that Pulaski "was renowned throughout Europe for the courage and bravery he displayed in defense of his country's freedom." Pulaski departed France from Nantes in June, and arrived in Marblehead, Massachusetts, near Boston, on July 23, 1777. After his arrival, Pulaski wrote to Washington, "I came here, where freedom is being defended, to serve it, and to live or die for it."

On August 20, he met Washington in his headquarters in Neshaminy Falls, outside Philadelphia. He showed off riding stunts, and argued for the superiority of cavalry over infantry.  Because Washington was unable to grant him an officer rank, Pulaski spent the next few months traveling between Washington and the United States Congress in Philadelphia, awaiting his appointment. His first military engagement against the British occurred before he received it, on September 11, 1777, at the Battle of Brandywine. When the Continental Army troops began to yield, he reconnoitered with Washington's bodyguard of about 30 men, and reported that the enemy were endeavoring to cut off the line of retreat. Washington ordered him to collect as many as possible of the scattered troops who came his way and employ them according to his discretion to secure the retreat of the army. His subsequent charge averted a disastrous defeat of the Continental Army cavalry, earning him fame in America and saving the life of George Washington. As a result, on September 15, 1777, on the orders of Congress, Washington commissioned Pulaski a brigadier general in the Continental Army cavalry. At that point, the cavalry was only a few hundred men strong organized into four regiments. These men were scattered among numerous infantry formations, and used primarily for scouting duties. Pulaski immediately began work on reforming the cavalry, and wrote the first regulations for the formation.

On September 16, while on patrol west of Philadelphia, Pulaski spotted significant British forces moving toward the Continental position. Upon being informed by Pulaski, Washington prepared for a battle, but the encounter was interrupted by a major storm before either side was organized. On October 4, Pulaski took part in the Battle of Germantown. He spent the winter of 1777 to 1778 with most of the army at Valley Forge. Pulaski argued that the military operations should continue through the winter, but this idea was rejected by the general staff. In turn, he directed his efforts towards reorganizing the cavalry force, mostly stationed in Trenton. While at Trenton his assistance was requested by General Anthony Wayne, whom Washington had dispatched on a foraging expedition into southern New Jersey. Wayne was in danger of encountering a much larger British force sent to oppose his movements. Pulaski and 50 cavalry rode south to Burlington, where they skirmished with British sentries on February 28. After this minor encounter the British commander, Lieutenant Colonel Thomas Stirling, was apparently convinced that he was facing a much larger force than expected, and prepared to withdraw his troops across the Delaware River into Pennsylvania at Cooper's Ferry (present-day Gloucester City). Pulaski and Wayne joined forces to attack Stirling's position on February 29 while he awaited suitable weather conditions to cross. In the resulting skirmish (which only involved a few hundred men out of the larger forces on either side), Pulaski's horse was shot out from under him and a few of his cavalry were wounded.

American officers serving under Pulaski had difficulty taking orders from a foreigner who could scarcely speak English and whose ideas of discipline and tactics differed enormously from those to which they were accustomed. This resulted in friction between the Americans and Pulaski and his fellow Polish officers. There was also discontent in the unit over delays in pay, and Pulaski's imperious personality was a regular source of discontent among his peers, superiors, and subordinates. Pulaski was also unhappy that his suggestion to create a lancer unit was denied. Despite a commendation from Wayne, these circumstances prompted Pulaski to resign his general command in March 1778, and return to Valley Forge.

Pulaski went to Yorktown, where he met with General Horatio Gates and suggested the creation of a new unit. At Gates' recommendation, Congress confirmed his previous appointment to the rank of a brigadier general, with a special title of "Commander of the Horse", and authorized the formation of a corps of 68 lancers and 200 light infantry. This corps, which became known as the Pulaski Cavalry Legion, was recruited mainly in Baltimore, where it was headquartered. Henry Wadsworth Longfellow would later commemorate in verse the consecration of the Legion's banner. By August 1778, it numbered about 330 men, both Americans and foreigners. British major general Charles Lee commented on the high standards of the Legion's training. The "father of the American cavalry" demanded much of his men and trained them in tested cavalry tactics. He used his own personal finances when money from Congress was scarce, in order to assure his forces of the finest equipment and personal safety. However, later that year a controversy arose related to the Legion's finances, and its requisitions from the local populace. His troubles with the auditors continued until his death; Pulaski complained that he received inadequate funds, was obstructed by locals and officials, and was forced to spend his own money. He was not cleared of these charges until after his death.

In the autumn Pulaski was ordered to Little Egg Harbor on the coast of southeast New Jersey, where in the engagement on October 15, known as the Affair at Little Egg Harbor, the legion suffered heavy losses. During the following winter Pulaski was stationed at Minisink, at that time in northwestern New Jersey. Ordered to take part in the punitive Sullivan Expedition against the Iroquois, he was dissatisfied with this command, and intended to leave the service and return to Europe, but instead asked to be reassigned to the Southern front. On February 2, 1779, Washington instead ordered him to South Carolina.

Southern front 

Pulaski arrived in Charleston on May 8, 1779, finding the city in crisis. General Benjamin Lincoln, commander of the southern army, had led most of the army toward Augusta, Georgia, in a bid to recapture Savannah, which had been captured by the British in late 1778. The British commander, Brigadier General Augustine Prevost, responded to Lincoln's move by launching a raiding expedition from Savannah across the Savannah River. The South Carolina militia fell back before the British advance, and Prevost's force followed them all the way to Charleston. Pulaski arrived just as military leaders were establishing the city's defenses. When the British advanced on May 11, Pulaski's Legion engaged forward elements of the British force, and was badly mauled in the encounter. The Legion infantry, numbering only about 60 men before the skirmish, was virtually wiped out, and Pulaski was forced to retreat to the safety of the city's guns. Although some historians credit this action with Prevost's decision to withdraw back toward Savannah the next day (despite ongoing negotiations of a possible surrender of Charleston), that decision is more likely based on news Prevost received that Lincoln's larger force was returning to Charleston to face him, and that Prevost's troops had gone further than he had originally intended. One early historian criticized Pulaski's actions during that engagement as "ill-judged, ill-conducted, disgraceful and disastrous".  The episode was of minor strategic consequence and did little to enhance the reputation of Pulaski's unit.

Although Pulaski frequently suffered from malaria while stationed in Charleston, he remained in active service. At the beginning of September, Lincoln prepared to launch an attempt to retake Savannah with French assistance. Pulaski was ordered to Augusta, where he was to join forces with General Lachlan McIntosh. Their combined forces were to serve as the forward elements of Lincoln's army. Pulaski captured a British outpost near Ogeechee River. His units then acted as an advance guard for the allied French units under Admiral Charles Hector, comte d'Estaing. He rendered great services during the siege of Savannah, and in the assault of October 9 commanded the whole cavalry, both French and American.

Death and burial 
While attempting to rally fleeing French forces during a cavalry charge, Pulaski was mortally wounded by grapeshot. The reported grapeshot is on display at the Georgia Historical Society in Savannah. The Charleston Museum also has a grapeshot reported to be from Pulaski's wound. Pulaski was carried from the field of battle and taken aboard the South Carolina merchant brig privateer Wasp, under the command of Captain Samuel Bulfinch, where he died two days later, having never regained consciousness. His heroic death, admired by American Patriot supporters, further boosted his reputation in America.

Pulaski never married and had no descendants. Despite his fame, there have long been uncertainties and controversies surrounding both his place and date of birth, and his burial. Many primary sources record a burial at sea. The historical accounts for Pulaski's time and place of burial vary considerably. According to several contemporary accounts there were witnesses, including Pulaski's aide-de-camp, that Pulaski received a symbolic burial in Charleston on October 21, sometime after he was buried at sea. Other witnesses, including Captain Samuel Bulfinch of the Wasp, claimed that the wounded Pulaski was actually later removed from the ship and taken to the Greenwich Plantation in the town of Thunderbolt, near Savannah, where he died and was buried.

In March 1825, during his grand tour of the United States, Lafayette personally laid the cornerstone for the Casimir Pulaski Monument in Savannah, Georgia.

Exhumation and analysis of remains 
In 1853 remains found on a bluff above Augustine Creek on Greenwich Plantation were believed to be the general's. These bones are interred at the Casimir Pulaski Monument in Savannah, Georgia. They were exhumed in 1996 and examined during a forensic study. The eight-year examination, including DNA analysis, ended inconclusively, although the skeleton was consistent with Pulaski's age and occupation. A healed wound on the skull's forehead was consistent with historical records of an injury Pulaski sustained in battle, as was a bone defect on the left cheekbone, believed to have been caused by a benign tumor.  In 2005, the remains were reinterred in a public ceremony with full military honors, including Pulaski's induction into the Georgia Military Hall of Fame.

A later study funded by the Smithsonian Institution, the results of which were released in 2019, concluded from the mitochondrial DNA of his grandniece, known injuries, and physical characteristics, that the skeleton was likely Pulaski's. The skeleton has a number of typically female features, which has led to the hypothesis that Pulaski may have been female or intersex. A documentary based on the Smithsonian study suggests that Pulaski's hypothesized intersex condition could have been caused by congenital adrenal hyperplasia, where a fetus with female chromosomes is exposed to a high level of testosterone in utero and develops partially male genitals. This analysis was based on the skeleton's female pelvis, facial structure and jaw angle, in combination with the fact that Pulaski identified as and lived as male.

Tributes and commemoration 

The United States has long commemorated Pulaski's contributions to the American Revolutionary War, and already on October 29, 1779, the United States Congress passed a resolution that a monument should be dedicated to him, but the first monument to him, the Casimir Pulaski Monument in Savannah, Georgia, was not built until 1854. A bust of Pulaski was added to a collection of other busts of American heroes at United States Capitol in 1867. On May 11, 1910, US President William Taft revealed a Congress-sponsored General Casimir Pulaski statue. In 1929, Congress passed another resolution, this one recognizing October 11 of each year as "General Pulaski Memorial Day", with a large parade held annually on Fifth Avenue in New York City. Separately, a Casimir Pulaski Day is celebrated in Illinois and some other places on the first Monday of each March. In some Illinois school districts, the day is an official school holiday. After a previous attempt failed, Congress passed a joint resolution conferring honorary U.S. citizenship on Pulaski in 2009, sending it to President Barack Obama for approval. He duly signed it on November 6, 2009, making Pulaski the seventh person so honored.

In Poland, in 1793 Pulaski's relative, Antoni Pułaski, obtained a cancellation of his brother's sentence from 1773. He has been mentioned in the literary works of numerous Polish authors, including Adam Mickiewicz, Juliusz Słowacki and Józef Ignacy Kraszewski. Adolf Nowaczyński wrote a drama "Pułaski w Ameryce" (Pulaski in America) in 1917. A museum dedicated to Pulaski, the Casimir Pulaski Museum in Warka, opened in 1967.

Throughout Poland and the United States, people have celebrated anniversaries of Pulaski's birth and death, and there exist numerous objects of art such as paintings and statues of him. In 1879, to commemorate the 100th anniversary of his death, Henri Schoeller composed "A Pulaski March". Twenty years earlier, Eduard Sobolewski composed his opera, "Mohega", about the last days of Pulaski's life. Commemorative medals and stamps of Pulaski have been issued. Several cities, towns, townships and counties in United States are named after him, as are numerous streets, parks and structures.
 
Although his statue stands in Savannah's Monterey Square, the city's Pulaski Square is named for him.

The Pulaski Bridge in New York City links Brooklyn to Queens; the Pulaski Skyway in Northern New Jersey links Jersey City to Newark, and the Pulaski Highway traverses the city of Baltimore, Maryland.

Michigan designated US Highway 112 (now US 12) as Pulaski Memorial Highway in 1935.

There are also a number of educational, academic, and Polish-American institutions named after him. A 20th-century US Navy ballistic missile submarine, USS Casimir Pulaski, was named for him, as was, in the 19th-century, a United States Revenue Cutter Service cutter, USRC Pulaski and a side-wheel steam gunboat, USS Pulaski.    A Polish frigate, ORP Generał Kazimierz Pułaski, is also named after Pulaski. Fort Pulaski between Savannah and Tybee Island in Georgia, active during the American Civil War, is named in honor of Casimir Pulaski.  Pulaski Barracks, an active U.S. Army post in Kaiserslautern, Germany, is named for Casimir Pulaski in honor of the Polish people who worked for the U.S. Army in Civilian Service Groups after WWII.  A statue commemorating Pulaski stands at the eastern end of Freedom Plaza in Washington, D.C. There is an equestrian statue of Pulaski in Roger Williams Park in Providence, Rhode Island, as well as one in the center of Pulaski park in Manchester, New Hampshire.  A statue by Granville W. Carter depicting Pulaski on a rearing horse signaling a forward charge with a sword in his right hand is erected in Hartford, Connecticut. There is a Pulaski Monument in Patterson Park in Baltimore, Maryland.  There is also a statue in Buffalo, NY near the intersection of Main and S. Division St.

The villages of Mt. Pulaski, Illinois, Pulaski, New York, and Pulaski, Wisconsin, are named for him, as is the city of Pulaski, Tennessee. Pulaski High School and Casimir Pulaski High School, both in Wisconsin, are also named after him, as is Pulaski Middle School in New Britain, Connecticut. Pulaski County in Virginia, Pulaski County in Arkansas, Pulaski County in Georgia, Pulaski County in Missouri, Pulaski County in Kentucky, and Pulaski County in Indiana are named after him as well.

Polish historian Władysław Konopczyński, who wrote a monograph on Pulaski in 1931, noted that he was one of the most accomplished Polish people, grouping him with other Polish military heroes such as Tadeusz Kościuszko, Stanisław Żółkiewski, Stefan Czarniecki, and Prince Józef Poniatowski.

In popular culture

 Michigan-born songwriter Sufjan Stevens released a song called "Casimir Pulaski Day" on his album Illinois. The song interweaves his memories of a friend's battle with bone cancer with an account of the holiday.
 In a downloadable content of Age of Empires III, twelve Uhlan cavalry units can be summoned by the player by clicking on a shipment button called Pulaski's Legion.
 An account of Pulaski's death and burial is used as the background and setting for the family reunion of two POV characters in Diana Gabaldon's ninth main  Outlander novel, Go Tell the Bees That I Am Gone (2021). Her historical observations and inspirations are in her author's notes.

See also 

 Casimir Pulaski Foundation - leading Polish think tank specialized in foreign policy and national security
 Johann de Kalb, a Bavarian-born French officer who served as a general in the Continental Army
 Gilbert du Motier, Marquis de Lafayette, a French officer who served as a general in the Continental Army
 The General Was Female?, documentary film about Pulaski's possible intersex status
 Intersex people and military service in the United States
 Knight of Freedom Award, an award established in honour of General Pulaski
 Michael Kovats de Fabriczy, a Hungarian nobleman and cavalry officer who served in the Continental Army
 List of Poles
 Friedrich Wilhelm von Steuben, a Prussian drill master who served in the Continental Army

Explanatory notes

Citations

General bibliography 

 
 
 
 
 , Url
 
 
 
 
 
 
 
 
 
 
 
 
 
 
 
 
 
 
 
 
 
 
 
  Proclaiming Casimir Pulaski to be an honorary citizen of the United States.
 
 
 
 
 Presidential Studies Quarterly Vol. XXIV No. 4 Fall 1994, pp. 876–77
 
 
 
 
  Url

Further reading 
 
  Url
  Url
 
 Shepherd, Joshua, Soldiers: Casimir Pulaski, Warfare History Network, February 13, 2019

External links 

 A Chronology of Casimir Pulaski's Life 1745–1779
 One More Funeral of Kazimierz Pulaski 221 Years After his Death
 Biography from Catholic Encyclopedia
 Casimir Pulaski Day, the Office of Civil Rights and Diversity at Eastern Illinois University. Leszek Szymański, Casimir Pulaski: A Hero of the American Revolution, E207.P8 S97 1994.
 
 
 Casimir Pulaski Foundation

 
1745 births
1779 deaths
Bar confederates
Burials in Georgia (U.S. state)
Continental Army officers from Poland
Intersex men
Intersex military personnel
Intersex people and military service in the United States
Military personnel from Warsaw
Nobility from Warsaw
People sentenced to death in absentia
Polish emigrants to the United States
Polish generals in other armies
Polish Roman Catholics
Casimir
United States military personnel killed in the American Revolutionary War